Bisnode was a company that offers decision support in the form of digital business, marketing and credit information. Founded in 1989, Bisnode was owned 70 percent by Ratos and 30 percent by Bonnier. In 2020. Dun and Bradstreet acquired Bisnode for $811.60 million. Bisnode is present in 19 European countries and has its headquarters in Stockholm, Sweden. The company's revenue is just under SEK 4 billion.

History 
Bisnode traces its roots back to Sveriges Handelskalendar, a trade directory which was founded in 1859 and became the starting pistol for Bonnier's business-information operations. In 1982, Bonnier-owned Affärsdata started publishing business information digitally. In 1986, Bonnier gave tech entrepreneur Lars Save and Bonnier executive Håkan Ramsin a budget of 15 million SEK to create a business plan for making digital business information services profitable.

In 1989, Bisnode's predecessor Bonnier Business Services was founded. During the first half of the 1990s, the company carried out a number of acquisitions of different sizes. It specialized in purchasing problem companies and making them flourish. In 1999, Bonnier's business information was separated from the customer-information operations and named Bonnier Affärsinformation (BAF). In 2005, the private equity company Ratos acquired 70 percent of BAF, which purchased Infodata from Ratos.

In 2006, the group was renamed Bisnode. In 2012, under the leadership of the new CEO Lars Pettersson, a significant change was set in motion, with the goal to unite all Bisnode-owned companies in Europe under the Bisnode brand. Completed in 2014, Bisnode's 9 400 square-meter head-office building is situated alongside the E4 in Solna.

As of December 2020, Bisnode was acquired by Dun & Bradstreet

Bisnode’s CEOs 
Lars Save 1989–2008
Johan Wall 2008–2012
Lars Pettersson 2012–2015
 Magnus Silfverberg 2015 - current

Staff 
Bisnode had around 3 000 employees in 19 European countries. About 1 000 (a third) of the group's people are based in Sweden and makeup around half of Bisnode's revenue. Broken down by sex, approximately 46 percent of Bisnode's employees are female and 54 per cent are male. The average age is 34.

International offices 
Bisnode has offices in these 19 countries:

Sweden
Switzerland
Denmark
Slovakia
Norway
Hungary
Finland
Czech Republic
Estonia
Croatia
Belgium
Bosnia and Hercegovina
Netherlands
Serbia
France
Poland
Germany
Slovenia
Austria

See also
 Experian

References

External links 
 

Dun & Bradstreet
Credit rating agencies